Sam Meas (born ) is a Haverhill, Massachusetts-based political candidate who has run as both a Republican and later a Democrat. Meas is the first Cambodian-American in U.S. history to run for Congress.

Personal life
He was born Meas Sombo, and grew up in Kandal Province, Cambodia. He lost his father to the Khmer Rouge and was subsequently separated from his mother and sisters during the Vietnamese invasion of Cambodia. He fled Cambodia with a cousin and ended up at the Khao-I-Dang refugee camp in Thailand. In 1986 he was sponsored as a refugee by Catholic Charities USA and moved to Virginia, where he lived with a foster family. He did not know his exact date of birth at the time; an examination by an orthodontist engaged by the Immigration and Naturalization Service estimated his year of birth to be between 1970 and 1972. As a result, Meas chose 31 December 1972 as his legal date of birth, not knowing that the date he had chosen, New Year's Eve, was a major holiday in the United States. In 1996, Meas graduated from Virginia Tech with a degree in finance.

Meas is married to his wife Leah and together they have two children, Monique and Sydney. Meas and his wife currently reside in Haverhill, Massachusetts.

Career
In 2010, Meas unsuccessfully ran for a seat in Massachusetts's 5th congressional district, which includes the cities of Haverhill, Lawrence and Lowell. This made him the first Cambodian-American in U.S. history to run for Congress. In 2012, Meas was a Republican candidate for the Massachusetts State Senate (First Essex District). He lost the 6 September primary election to fellow Republican Shaun Toohey, who received 70% of the votes. Meas went on to work as a campaign manager for Rady Mom, but the two men later had a falling-out. He challenged Mom unsuccessfully for the 18th Middlesex District seat in the 2018 Massachusetts general election.

Outside of politics, Meas has worked at the State Street Corporation and also owns a grocery store in Lynn, Massachusetts. He has served on the board of directors of the North Suffolk Mental Association.

References

External links
Sam Meas for Congress official website
Lowell's Cambodian Leaders Say More Need to Stand Up and Be Counted Perry, Dave. Lowell Sun, 26 October 2009, p. 1
GOP Field for Congress widens Murphy, Matt Lowell Sun 23 November 2009, p. 1

1970s births
American people of Cambodian descent
Asian-American people in Massachusetts politics
Living people
Massachusetts Republicans
Politicians from Haverhill, Massachusetts
People from Kandal province
Virginia Tech alumni